Mohammad Asim Kamal (born 31 May 1976) is a Pakistani former cricketer who played for the Pakistan national cricket team between 2003 and 2005.

He scored 99 against South Africa on his Test debut. Kamal has played 12 Tests (20 innings) since his debut. Kamal has made 87 against Australia, and a 91 and 73 against India. Kamal has scored 8 half-centuries. He has also taken 10 catches.

References

1976 births
Living people
Karachi cricketers
Pakistan International Airlines cricketers
Pakistan Test cricketers
Pakistani cricketers
Cricketers from Karachi
Karachi Blues cricketers
Karachi Whites cricketers
Pakistan Customs cricketers
Karachi Urban cricketers
Habib Bank Limited cricketers
Port Qasim Authority cricketers
Karachi Zebras cricketers
Karachi Dolphins cricketers
Pakistan Telecommunication Company Limited cricketers